Fairview Avenue station is a light rail station along the Metro Green Line in Saint Paul, Minnesota. It is located along University Avenue between Lynnhurst Avenue and Fairview Avenue.  A preliminary architectural design revealed in May 2009 featured oak trees and was inspired by the trees in the neighborhood's parks.

Construction in this area began in March 2011.  The station opened along with the rest of the line in 2014.

Notable places nearby
Dickerman Park
Griggs Midway Building

References

External links
Metro Transit: Fairview Avenue Station

Metro Green Line (Minnesota) stations in Saint Paul, Minnesota
Railway stations in the United States opened in 2014
2014 establishments in Minnesota